Marie Jacquet (born 29 March 1994) is a French rower. She competed in the women's quadruple sculls event at the 2020 Summer Olympics.

References

External links
 

1994 births
Living people
French female rowers
Olympic rowers of France
Rowers at the 2020 Summer Olympics
Place of birth missing (living people)